The Difference Engine is the second album from stoner rock band Beaver. Released on Elegy Records in 1997.

Track listing
 "On Parade"
 "Enter The Treasury"
 "The Reaper"
 "Magic 7"
 "Friendly Planet"
 "Green"
 "Surrender"
 "Supernova"
 "A Premonition"
 "Infinity's Blacksmith"

Personnel
Roel Schoenmakers - Guitars & Vocals

Joszja De Weerdt - Guitars

Milo Beenhakker - Bass

Eva Nahon - Drums

Credits
Produced by Beaver & Jacques de Haard

Except 'Green' produced by Josh Homme & Dave Catching & Hutch

Recorded at Via Ritmo Studio, Rotterdam, fall 1997

Mastered by Fir Suidema

Graphics by Beaver & Jason

All songs by Beaver

References 

Beaver (band) albums
1997 albums